Saleh Al-Dosari (born December 19, 1987) is a Saudi footballer who plays as a midfielder.

External links
Saudi League Profile

1987 births
Living people
Saudi Arabian footballers
Association football midfielders
Al Hilal SFC players
Al-Riyadh SC players
Saudi First Division League players
Saudi Professional League players